From Home to Home is a 1970 album by the English prog-rock group Fairfield Parlour. In 2000 was re-released as double longplay album by "Burning Airlines" and marketed in 2001 by "Get Back" only in Italy.

Track listing

Bonus tracks by Repertoire (CD)

Personnel
 Peter Daltrey: vocals and organ
 Eddy Pumer: guitar
 Steve Clark: bass
 Dan Bridgman: drums

See also
 Kaleidoscope
 Peter Daltrey

References

1970 debut albums
Fairfield Parlour albums
Vertigo Records albums
Repertoire Records albums